The 2019 Denver Pioneers men's soccer team represented University of Denver during the 2019 NCAA Division I men's soccer season and the 2019 Summit League men's soccer season. The regular season began on August 30 and concluded on November 9. It was the program's 59th season fielding a men's varsity soccer team, and their 7th season in the Summit League. The 2019 season was Jamie Franks's fifth year as head coach for the program.

Roster

Schedule 

Source:

|-
!colspan=6 style=""| Non-conference regular season
|-

|-
!colspan=6 style=""| Summit League regular season
|-

|-
!colspan=6 style=""| Summit League Tournament
|-

|-
!colspan=6 style=""| NCAA Tournament
|-

References 

2019
Denver Pioneers
Denver Pioneers
Denver Pioneers men's soccer
Denver Pioneers